The 1931 All-Ireland Senior Hurling Championship was the 46th staging of the All-Ireland hurling championship since its establishment by the Gaelic Athletic Association in 1887. The championship began on 1 May 1932 and ended on 4 September 1932.

Cork were the defending champions, however, they were defeated in the provincial series of games. Kilkenny won the title following a 3–3 to 2–3 victory over Clare in the final.

Teams

A total of twelve teams contested the championship, the same number of participants from the previous championship. There were no new entrants.

Team summaries

Results

Leinster Senior Hurling Championship

Munster Senior Hurling Championship

All-Ireland Senior Hurling Championship

Championship statistics

Scoring

Widest winning margin: 19 points 
Clare 8-3 - 2-2 Kerry (Munster semi-final, 3 July 1932)
Most goals in a match: 10 
Clare 9-4 – 4-14 Galway (All-Ireland semi-final, 14 August 1932)
Most points in a match: 23 
Clare 9-4 – 4-14 Galway (All-Ireland semi-final, 14 August 1932)
Most goals by one team in a match: 9 
Clare 9-4 – 4-14 Galway (All-Ireland semi-final, 14 August 1932)
Most goals scored by a losing team: 5 
Offaly 5-2 – 6-8 Laois (Leinster quarter-final, 8 May 1932)
Most points scored by a losing team: 6 
Galway 4-14 - 9-4 Clare (All-Ireland semi-final, 14 August 1932)

Miscellaneous

 The Munster quarter-final clash of Cork and Waterford and the Munster semi-final clash of Clare and Kerry, both scheduled for 5 June 1932, are postponed.
 Clare win the Munster title for the first time since 1914.
 Clare overcame a halftime deficit of 13 points in the All Ireland semifinal against Galway (2-00 4-07) by scoring 7-04 in the second half to Galway's 0-07. It's remains (July 2022) the largest halftime deficit clawed back in an All Ireland semifinal.
 There are a number of first-ever meetings. The All-Ireland semi-final between Clare and Galway is their first ever championship clash, while Clare and Kilkenny meet for the first time in the subsequent All-Ireland final.

Sources

 Corry, Eoghan, The GAA Book of Lists (Hodder Headline Ireland, 2005).
 Donegan, Des, The Complete Handbook of Gaelic Games (DBA Publications Limited, 2005).

External links
 1932 All-Ireland Senior Hurling Championship results

References

1932